Pilipectus is a genus of moths in the family Erebidae. The genus was erected by George Thomas Bethune-Baker in 1910.

Species
Pilipectus chinensis Draeseke, 1931
Pilipectus cyclopis Hampson, 1912
Pilipectus ocellatus Bethune-Baker, 1910
Pilipectus prunifera (Hampson, 1894)
Pilipectus taiwanus Wileman, 1915

References

Calpinae
Moth genera